The streaked bowerbird (Amblyornis subalaris) is a species of bowerbird, native to the Bird's Tail Peninsula (southeastern New Guinea). They are approximately 22 cm long and have an olive-brown colouring. The male has a short orange crest which is not visible unless displayed.

The streaked bowerbird is a polygamous species. The nest is built by the male out of sticks. It has a characteristic hut shape with two entrances.

References

External links
 BirdLife Species Factsheet

streaked bowerbird
Birds of the Papuan Peninsula
streaked bowerbird